{{Taxobox
| image = BritishTunicataPlate54.jpg
| image_caption = Morchellium argus, illustrations at top
| regnum = Animalia
| phylum = Chordata
| subphylum = Tunicata
| classis = Ascidiacea
| ordo = Enterogona
| subordo = Aplousobranchia
| familia = Polyclinidae
| genus = Morchellium
| species = M. argus
| binomial = Morchellium argus
| binomial_authority = (Milne-Edwards, 1841)
| synonyms = 
 Amaroucium argus' Milne-Edwards, 1841
 Aplidium argus (Milne-Edwards, 1841)
}}Morchellium argus, the red-flake ascidian''', is a species of colonial sea squirt, a tunicate in the family Polyclinidae. It is native to shallow water in the northeastern Atlantic Ocean, especially round the coasts of Britain.

Description
Each zooid has a buccal siphon with eight flaps and a tongue-like process underneath. This siphon opens into a large pharynx through which water is drawn into the interior, but the colony has a single exit siphon through which the water from several zooids is expelled. The zooids are translucent white, pale pink or red and there are four small red spots at the entrance to the pharynx, which distinguishes this tunicate from similar species.

Distribution and habitatMorchellium argus is native to the northeastern Atlantic Ocean. It is common round the coasts of Britain, as far north as the Shetland Isles. It is also known from the west of France including Arcachon Bay. It is found at depths down to about  mainly in caves, under overhangs and on vertical surfaces, often among foliose algae.

BiologyMorchellium argus draws in water through its buccal siphon, filters out zooplankton and other food particles and then expels the water. Gas exchange takes place at the same time.Morchellium argus'' is a hermaphrodite. The gonads are in the body cavity and sperm passes out with the exhalent water. When this sperm is drawn into another individual zooid, internal fertilisation can occur. The early developmental stages take place inside the zooid and the larvae are later liberated into the sea. After a short free-living stage, these attach themselves to a surface, undergo metamorphosis, and start a new colony. Further development is by budding of new zooids. The function of the red spots in the pharynx is unclear.

References

External links
 

Enterogona
Animals described in 1841